The Man from Snowy River: Arena Spectacular is a musical by David Atkins and Ignatius Jones, based on the poem The Man from Snowy River, written by Banjo Paterson.

All poetry narrated in the musical was written by Banjo Paterson, including "Waltzing Matilda" (for which the music was written by M. Cowan).

Bruce Rowland composed the instrumental music for both the 1982 film The Man from Snowy River film and its sequel 1988 film The Man from Snowy River II (American title for the 1988 sequel: "Return to Snowy River").  Rowland composed special arrangements of some of his music for "The Man from Snowy River: Arena Spectacular" musical and also conducted the orchestra.

Lee Kernaghan and Garth Porter wrote the music and lyrics for the country songs.  Lee Kernaghan also sang some of the country songs (which he had already recorded on some of his albums), during the concert scene.

AT the ARIA Music Awards of 2002, the soundtrack won Best Original Soundtrack, Cast or Show Album.

Track listing
 "Waltzing Matilda" — (Traditional version) — Instrumental — music composed by M. Cowan, poem (lyrics) written by Banjo Paterson
 "Prelude" — poem written by Banjo Paterson — narrated by Steve Bisley
 "Mustering the Colts" — Instrumental — music composed by Bruce Rowland
 "Spirit of the High Country" — music and lyrics by Lee Kernaghan and Garth Porter — sung by Lee Kernaghan
 "Southern Son" — music and lyrics by Lee Kernaghan and Garth Porter — sung by Martin Crewes
 "Snowy Mountains Buck Jump" — music and lyrics by Lee Kernaghan and Garth Porter — sung by Lee Kernaghan
 "Jessica's Theme" — Instrumental — music composed by Bruce Rowland
 "The Rope That Pulls the Wind" — music and lyrics by Lee Kernaghan and Garth Porter — sung by Martin Crewes
 "The Breakout" — Instrumental — music composed by Bruce Rowland
 "Kosciusko Moon" — music and lyrics by Lee Kernaghan and Garth Porter — sung by Martin Crewes and Georgie Parker
 "Boys From the Bush" — music and lyrics by Lee Kernaghan and Garth Porter — sung by Lee Kernaghan
 "Waltzing Matilda" — (Queensland version) — Instrumental — music composed by Bruce Rowland
 "Pull the Other One Mate" — music and lyrics by Lee Kernaghan and Garth Porter — sung by Lee Kernaghan and the Riders
 "Eureka Creek" — Instrumental — music composed by Bruce Rowland
 "A Handful of Dust" — music and lyrics by Lee Kernaghan and Garth Porter — sung by Martin Crewes and Georgie Parker
 "As Long As Your Eyes Are Blue" — music (for "Clancy's Theme") composed by Bruce Rowland — poem (lyrics) written by Banjo Paterson — sung by Georgie Parker
 "The Departure, The Ride, The Return" — Instrumental — music composed by Bruce Rowland
 "The Man from Snowy River" — poem written by Banjo Paterson — narrated by Steve Bisley
 "Spirit of the High Country" (Reprise) — music and lyrics by Lee Kernaghan and Garth Porter — sung by Lee Kernaghan
 "Waltzing Matilda" — (Traditional version) — Instrumental — music composed by M. Cowan — poem written by Banjo Paterson
 "Epilogue - A Singer of the Bush" — poem written by Banjo Paterson — narrated by Steve Bisley

Personnel

Performers

 Mick Albeck – musician
 Steve Bisley – cast member as "Banjo Patterson"
 Martin Crewes – cast member and singer: as "Jim Ryan" (The 'Man')
 Mitch Farmer — musician
 James Gillard – musician
 Tommy Grasso – musician
 Conrad Helfrich – musician
 Lee Kernaghan – musician and singer
 Rod McCormack – musician
 Robyn McKelvie – musician
 Lawrie Minson – musician
 Georgie Parker – cast member and singer as "Kate Conroy"
 Mark Punch – musician
 Michel Rose – musician
 Victorian Philharmonic Orchestra – orchestration

Production

 David Atkins – executive producer
 David Cheshire – assistant engineer
 Greg Ellis – copying and score preparation
 Robin Grey – engineer
 Conrad Helfrich – producer / additional arrangements and score preparation
 Ted Howard – engineer
 Amber Jacobsen –  executive producer
 Giles Muldoon – assistant engineer
 Garth Porter – music composer and producer 
 Bruce Rowland – music composer / music conductor /music arranger

References

External links

Cast recordings
ARIA Award winners
The Man from Snowy River
2002 live albums
2002 soundtrack albums
Theatre soundtracks